The 35th Annual TV Week Logie Awards was held on Friday 19 March 1993 at the Grand Hyatt in Melbourne, and broadcast on Network Ten. The ceremony was hosted by Bert Newton and guests included John Spencer, Vanessa Williams, Tom Jones, Pamela Stephenson, Juliet Mills, Hayley Mills, Yahoo Serious and Dame Edna.

Nominees and winners
Winners are listed first and highlighted in bold.

Gold Logie

Acting/Presenting

Most Popular Programs/Videos

Most Outstanding Programs

Performers
Tom Jones and John Farnham
Hot Shoe Shuffle
Jean Kittson and Mary-Anne Fahey
Julie McGregor
Rachael Beck
Kelley Abbey
Todd McKenney
Nathan Cavaleri

Hall of Fame
After a lifetime in Australian television, Reg Grundy became the 10th inductee into the TV Week Logies Hall of Fame.

References

External links
 

1993
1993 television awards
1993 in Australian television